SM U-159 was a Type U-158 submarine of the Imperial German Navy, built during the First World War.

SM U-159 was one of six 810-ton boats ordered in February 1917. She was one of two ships built to an improved design developed from the Type U-115 design, along with her sister, .  They were known as 'Project 25', and had a greatly increased radius of action. Both ships were built at Kaiserliche Werft Danzig, with U-159 being launched on 25 May 1918. The war ended before she could see active service, and she was broken up in 1919.

References

Notes

Citations

Bibliography

Type U 158 submarines
World War I submarines of Germany
Ships built in Danzig
1918 ships